Cycloclavine is an ergot alkaloid. It was first isolated in 1969 from seeds of Ipomoea hildebrandtii vatke. The first total synthesis of (±)-cycloclavine was published in 2008 by Szántay. Further reports came from Wipf and Petronijevic, Cao and Brewer. In 2016, Wipf and McCabe completed an 8-step asymmetric synthesis of (–)-cycloclavine, and in 2018, they expanded this approach toward (+)-cycloclavine and a biological characterization of the binding profile of both enantiomers on 16 brain receptors. Natural (+)- and unnatural (–)-cycloclavine demonstrated significant stereospecificity and unique binding profiles in comparison to LSD (lysergic acid diethylamide), psilocin, and DMT. Differential 5-HT receptor affinities, as well as novel sigma-1 receptor properties, suggest potential future therapeutic opportunities of clavine alkaloid scaffolds.

References

Ergot alkaloids
Heterocyclic compounds with 5 rings
Nitrogen heterocycles